Black Skull (Spanish: La calavera negra) is a 1960 Mexican western film directed by Joselito Rodríguez and starring  Luis Aguilar, Dagoberto Rodríguez and Pascual García Peña.

Cast
 Luis Aguilar as El Ranchero Solitario  
 Dagoberto Rodríguez as Manuel Noriega López  
 Pascual García Peña as Comisario  
 José Eduardo Pérez as Remigio García  
 Esperanza Issa as Médica  
 Irma Castillón as Hija de Manuel  
 Fanny Schiller as Esposa de Remigio  
 Emma Roldán as Hermana de Remigio  
 Enrique Zambrano 
 José Luis Rojas 
 Vicente Lara
 Ramón Bugarini as Ayudante de Comisario

References

Bibliography 
 Emilio García Riera. Historia documental del cine mexicano: 1959-1960. Universidad de Guadalajara, 1994.

External links 
 

1960 films
Mexican Western (genre) films
1960s Spanish-language films
Films directed by Joselito Rodríguez
1960s Mexican films